The 2025 IHF World Women's Handball Championship will be 27th edition of the championship to be jointly hosted by Germany and Netherlands under the aegis of International Handball Federation (IHF). It will be fourth time in history that the championship is jointly hosted.

Bidding process
Only Germany/Netherlands entered bid for hosting the tournament. The tournament was awarded to Germany/Netherlands by IHF Council in its meeting held in Cairo, Egypt, on 28 February 2020.

Qualification

1. To bear in mind the 2028 Summer Olympics, the IHF Council awarded the United States with wild cards for the 2025 and 2027 World Championships.

2. If countries from Oceania (Australia or New Zealand) participating in the Asian Championships finish within the top 5, they will qualify for the World Championships. If either finishes sixth or lower, the place would have been transferred to the wild card spot.

Qualified teams

Venues

On 16 May 2022 the German Handball Association (DHB) presented the German venues:

The Dutch venues will be presented by the Netherlands Handball Association at a later date.

References

External links

2025
World Championship, Women, 2025
2025 World Women's
2025 World Women's
Women's handball in the Netherlands
World Women's
World Women's